Ligosullo is a frazione of Treppo Ligosullo in the Province of Udine in the Italian region Friuli-Venezia Giulia, located about  northwest of Trieste and about  north of Udine. It was a separate comune until Februar 1 2018, when it was merged with Treppo Carnico, which created the Treppo Ligosullo comune.

Cities and towns in Friuli-Venezia Giulia